Edward Barbier is an environmental and resource economist. He holds the title of University Distinguished Professor, Department of Economics, Colorado State University.

Barbier is known, since 1989, for the promotion valuation frameworks for valuing nature in economic terms.  In 2009, He authored the United Nations’ Global Green New Deal, which connected environmentalism to an economic price.
In 2010, he wrote A Global Green New Deal: Rethinking the Economic Recovery, which connected the environment to climate change to human energy and water security, and to human poverty.

Barbier has influenced international environmental policy, including influence with the Australian Greens Party.

Career highlights 

Barbier was elected Fellow of the Association of Environmental and Resource Economists in 2015.

References

External links 
 Colorado State University staff page
 Edward Barbier on Google Scholar
 Personal website

Living people
Year of birth missing (living people)